The Ludu Library and Archive is a public library and newspaper archive in Letsekan quarter, Chanayethazan Township, Mandalay, Myanmar. Construction began in 2000, and the library was formally founded in 2004 by the family of Ludu U Hla and Daw Amar, prominent Burmese writers. The library was an extension of a private collection curated by the Ludu family and survived the 1984 Kya Gyi fire in Mandalay.

The library is a prominent reference library for Burmese scholars. Ludu Library possesses a collection of 50,000 books, 210 palm leaf manuscripts and 130 parabaiks, and also special collections of prominent Burmese writers, including Than Tun, Shwe U Daung, and Ludu Sein Win.

References 

Libraries in Myanmar
Buildings and structures in Mandalay
Libraries established in 2004
2004 establishments in Myanmar
Archives in Myanmar